Psilocybe collybioides is a species of agaric fungus in the family Hymenogastraceae. It was first described scientifically by mycologists Rolf Singer and Alexander H. Smith in 1958, from collections made in montane habitat near Tafí del Valle, Argentina. It is in the section Zapotecorum of the genus Psilocybe, other members of this section include Psilocybe muliercula, Psilocybe angustipleurocystidiata, Psilocybe aucklandii, Psilocybe graveolens, Psilocybe kumaenorum, Psilocybe zapotecorum, Psilocybe pintonii, Psilocybe subcaerulipes, Psilocybe moseri, Psilocybe zapotecoantillarum, Psilocybe zapotecocaribaea, and Psilocybe antioquiensis.

See also
List of psilocybin mushrooms
Psilocybin mushrooms

References

External links

Entheogens
Fungi described in 1958
Fungi of South America
Psychoactive fungi
collybioides
Psychedelic tryptamine carriers
Fungi of North America
Taxa named by Rolf Singer
Taxa named by Alexander H. Smith